The 2000 Sandwell Metropolitan Borough Council election took place on 4 May 2000 to elect members of Sandwell Metropolitan Borough Council in the West Midlands, England. One third of the council was up for election and the Labour party stayed in overall control of the council.

After the election, the composition of the council was
Labour 55
Liberal Democrat 10
Conservative 6
Independent 1

Campaign
Before the election Labour ran the council with 58 councillors compared to 9 Liberal Democrats, 3 Conservatives and 1 independent, with 1 Labour seat being vacant. The vacant seat was in Oldbury ward, after the former councillor, Mohammed Niwaz, was convicted of fraud the previous December. Among those who were defending seats in the election was the leader of the council, Tarsem King, in West Bromwich Central ward.

Both the Liberal Democrat and Conservative parties were hoping to make gains after some recent school closures, as well as dissatisfaction with the national Labour government. The Liberal Democrats were hoping to gain Hateley Heath, after having won a seat there in a by-election the previous November, and Oldbury. Meanwhile, the Conservatives aimed to take Wednesbury South and were defending Charlemont after the councillor defected to them from the Liberal Democrats. Labour defended their record, pointing to the lowest council tax rise in the region, and hoped to improve on recent low turnouts.

Election result
The results saw the Labour party stay in control of the council, but they did lose some seats. The Conservatives gained the seats of Old Warley and Princes End from Labour, while the Liberal Democrats took Hateley Heath from Labour. Alan Burkitt also held off the Liberal Democrats in Charlemont for the Conservatives.

Ward results

References

2000 English local elections
2000
2000s in the West Midlands (county)